English Gothic is an architectural style that flourished from the late 12th until the mid-17th century. The style was most prominently used in the construction of cathedrals and churches. Gothic architecture's defining features are pointed arches, rib vaults, buttresses, and extensive use of stained glass. Combined, these features allowed the creation of buildings of unprecedented height and grandeur, filled with light from large stained glass windows. Important examples include Westminster Abbey, Canterbury Cathedral and Salisbury Cathedral. The Gothic style endured in England much longer than in Continental Europe.

The Gothic style was introduced from France, where the various elements had first been used together within a single building at the choir of the Abbey of Saint-Denis north of Paris, completed in 1144. The earliest large-scale applications of Gothic architecture in England were Canterbury Cathedral and Westminster Abbey. Many features of Gothic architecture had evolved naturally from Romanesque architecture (often known in England as Norman architecture). The first cathedral in England to be both planned and built entirely in the Gothic style was Wells Cathedral, begun in 1175. Other features were imported from the Ile-de-France, where the first French Gothic cathedral, Sens Cathedral, had been built (1135–64). After a fire destroyed the choir of Canterbury Cathedral in 1174, the French architect William of Sens rebuilt the choir in the new Gothic style between 1175 and 1180. The transition can also be seen at Durham Cathedral, a Norman building which was remodelled with the earliest rib vault known. Besides cathedrals, monasteries, and parish churches, the style was used for many secular buildings, including university buildings, palaces, great houses, and almshouses and guildhalls.

Stylistic periodisations of the English Gothic style are 
  Early English or First Pointed (late 12th–late 13th centuries) 
  Decorated Gothic or Second Pointed (late 13th–late 14th centuries) 
  Perpendicular Gothic or Third Pointed (14th–17th centuries).

The architect and art historian Thomas Rickman's Attempt to Discriminate the Style of Architecture in England, first published in 1812, divided Gothic architecture in the British Isles into three stylistic periods. Rickman identified the period of architecture as follows: 
  William the Conqueror to Henry II as Norman 
  Richard the Lionheart to Edward I as Early English 
  reigns of Edward II and Edward III as Decorated 
  from Richard II to Henry VIII as Perpendicular

From the 15th century, under the House of Tudor, the prevailing Gothic style is commonly known as Tudor architecture. This style is ultimately succeeded by Elizabethan architecture and Renaissance architecture under Elizabeth I. 
Rickman excluded from his scheme most new buildings after Henry VIII's reign, calling the style of "additions and rebuilding" in the later 16th and earlier 17th centuries "often much debased".

Architect and art historian Edmund Sharpe, in The Seven Periods of English Architecture (1851),  identified a pre-Gothic Transitional Period (1145–90), following the Norman period, in which pointed arches and round arches were employed together. Focusing on the windows, Sharpe dubbed Rickman's Gothic styles as follows:
  Rickman's first Gothic style as the Lancet Period (1190–1245) 
  Rickman's second Gothic style divided into the Geometrical period (1245–1315) and then the Curvilinear period (1315–1360) 
   Rickman's third style as the Rectilinear period (1360–1550). Unlike the Early English and Decorated styles, this third style, employed over three centuries was unique to England.

In the English Renaissance, the stylistic language of the ancient classical orders and the Renaissance architecture of southern Europe began to supplant Gothic architecture in Continental Europe, but the British Isles continued to favour Gothic building styles, with traditional Perpendicular Gothic building projects undertaken into the 17th century in England and both Elizabethan and Jacobean architecture incorporating Gothic features, particularly for churches.

Classical-inspired architecture predominated after the Great Fire of London  The rebuilding of the City of London was so extensive that the numbers of workers employed broke the monopoly of the medieval livery company of stonemasons and the Worshipful Company of Masons and the role of master-mason was displaced by that of the early modern architect. The new St Paul's Cathedral designed by Christopher Wren and his Wren churches mostly dispensed with the Gothic idiom in favour of classical work. Outside London however, new ecclesiastical buildings and repairs to older churches were still carried out in Gothic style, particularly near the ancient university towns of Oxford and Cambridge, where the university colleges were important patrons of 17th-century Gothic construction.

By the 18th century, architects occasionally worked in Gothic style, but the living tradition of Gothic workmanship had faded and their designs rarely resembled medieval Gothic buildings. Only when the Gothic Revival movement of the late 18th and 19th centuries began, was the architectural language of medieval Gothic relearned through the scholarly efforts of early 19th-century art historians like Rickman and Matthew Bloxam, whose Principles of Gothic Ecclesiastical Architecture first appeared in 1829.

Alongside the new Gothic building work of the 19th century, many of England's existing Gothic buildings were extensively repaired, restored, remodelled, and rebuilt by architects seeking to improve the buildings according to the Romantic, high church aesthetic of the Oxford Movement and to replace many of the medieval features lost in the iconoclastic phases of the Reformation, the Dissolution of the Monasteries, and the Wars of the Three Kingdoms. In the process of this Victorian "restoration", much of the original Gothic architecture of the Middle Ages was lost or altered beyond recognition. However,  medieval works left unfinished were often completed or restored to their "original" designs. According to James Stevens Curl, the revival of Gothic architecture was "arguably, the most influential artistic phenomenon ever to spring from England".

The various English Gothic styles are seen at their most fully developed in cathedrals, monasteries, and collegiate churches. With the exception of Salisbury Cathedral, English cathedrals–having building dates that typically range over 400 years–show great stylistic diversity.

Early English Gothic (late 12th–late 13th centuries) 

Early English Gothic predominated from the late 12th century until midway to late in the 13th century, It succeeded Norman Architecture, which had introduced early great cathedrals, built of stone instead of timber, and saw the construction of remarkable abbeys throughout England. The Normans had introduced the three classical orders of architecture, and created massive walls for their buildings, with thin pilaster-like buttresses. The transition from Norman to Gothic lasted from about 1145 until 1190. In the reigns of King Stephen and Richard I, the style changed from the more massive severe Norman style to the more delicate and refined Gothic.

Early English was particularly influenced by what was called in English "The French style". The style was imported from Caen in Normandy by French Norman architects, who also imported cut stones from Normandy for their construction. It was also influenced by the architecture of the Ile-de-France, where  Sens Cathedral had been constructed, the first Gothic cathedral in France. The chancel of Canterbury Cathedral, one of the first Early English structures in England, was rebuilt in the new style by a French architect, William of Sens.

The Early English style particularly featured more strongly-constructed walls with stone vaulted roofs, to resist fire. The weight of these vaults was carried downwards and outwards by arched ribs. This feature, the early rib vault, was used at Durham Cathedral, the first time it was used this way in Europe.

Another important innovation introduced in this early period was the buttress, a stone column outside the structure that reinforced the walls against the weight pressing outward and downward from the vaults. This evolved into the flying buttress, which carried the thrust from the wall of the nave over the roof of the aisle. The buttress was given further support by a heavy stone pinnacle. Buttresses were an early feature of the chapter house of Lichfield Cathedral.

Early English is typified by lancet windows, tall narrow lights topped by a pointed arch. They were grouped together side by side under a single arch and decorated with mullions in tracery patterns, such as cusps, or spear-points. Lancet windows were combined similarly pointed arches and the ribs of the vaults overhead, giving a harmonious and unified style.

Characteristics

 The vertical plan of early Gothic Cathedrals had three levels, each of about equal height; the clerestory, with arched windows which admitted light on top, under the roof vaults; the triforium a wider covered arcade, in the middle; and, on the ground floor, on either side of the nave, wide arcades of columns and pillars, which supported the weight of the ceiling vaults through the ribs.
 The most distinctive element of this period was the pointed arch, (also known as the lancet arch, which was the key feature of the Gothic rib vault, The original purpose of rib vault was to allow a heavier stone ceiling, to replace the wooden roofs of the earlier Norman churches, which frequently caught fire. They also had the benefit of allowing the construction of higher and thinner walls. They appeared first in an early form in Durham Cathedral. Gradually, pointed arches were used not only for rib vaults, but also for all of the arcades and for lancet windows, giving the nave its unified appearance. The first structure in England to be built entirely with the pointed arch was Wells Cathedral (1175–1260), but they were soon used in all Cathedrals.
 The Early English rib vaults were usually quadripartite, each having four compartments divided by ribs, with each covering one bay of the ceiling. The horizontal ridge ribs intersected the summits of the cross ribs and diagonal ribs, and carried the weight outwards and downwards to pillars or columns of the triforium and arcades, and, in later cathedrals, outside the walls to the buttresses.
 The lancet window, narrow and tall with a point at the top, became a common feature of English architecture. For this reason, Early English Gothic is sometimes known as the Lancet style. The Lancet openings of windows and decorative arcading are often grouped in twos or threes. This characteristic is seen throughout Salisbury Cathedral, where groups of two lancet windows line the nave and groups of three line the clerestory. At York Minster the north transept has a cluster of five lancet windows known as the Five Sisters; each is 50 feet tall and still retains its original glass.
 Stained glass windows began to be widely used in the windows of the clerestory, transept and especially west façade. Many were elaborately decorated with tracery; that is, thin mullions or ribs of stone which divided the windows into elaborate geometric patterns. as at Lincoln Cathedral (1220). 
 Rose Windows were relatively rare in England, but Lincoln Cathedral has two notable examples from this period. The oldest is the Dean's Window in the north transept, which dates to 1220–1235. It is an example of an Early English plate-tracery rose window. The geometric design, with concentric tiers of circular window lights, predates the geometric tracery of the later decorated style of Gothic architecture. The principal theme of the window is the second coming of Christ and the last judgement. Some scenes are associated with death and resurrection, such as the funeral of Saint Hugh, the founder of the cathedral, and the death of the Virgin.
 Square east end. The typical arrangement for an English Gothic east end is square, and may be an unbroken cliff-like design as at York, Lincoln, Ripon, Ely and Carlisle or may have a projecting Lady Chapel of which there is a great diversity as at Salisbury, Lichfield, Hereford, Exeter and Chichester. 
 Sculptural decoration. Unlike the more sombre and heavy Norman churches, the Gothic churches began to have elaborate sculptural decoration. The arches of the arcades and triforium were sometimes decorated with dog tooth patterns, cusps, carved circles, and with trefoils, quatrefoils, as well as floral and vegetal designs. Simple floral motifs also often appeared on the capitals, the spandrels, the roof boss that joined the ribs of the vaults.
 The clustered column. Instead of being massive, solid pillars, early Gothic columns were often composed of clusters of slender, detached shafts, which descended the vaults above. These were often made of dark, polished Purbeck "marble", surrounding a central pillar, or pier, to which they are attached by circular moulded shaft-rings. One characteristic of Early Gothic in England is the great depth given to the hollows of the mouldings with alternating fillets and rolls, and by the decoration of the hollows with the dog-tooth ornament and by the circular abacus or tops of the capitals of the columns.

Examples
 the east end of Canterbury Cathedral (1174–84) rebuilt by French masons following a fire
 transept, nave and west front of Wells Cathedral (1176–1260; western towers added in the Perpendicular period, 1365–1435)
 clerestory and vaults of Chichester Cathedral (1187–99)
 retro-choir at Winchester Cathedral (1189–93; not including the Lady chapel)
 Lincoln Cathedral and chapter house (1192–1255; Not including the "Angel Choir", south transept, towers, and cloisters)
 east end and transept of Rochester Cathedral (1200–27)
 west front of Peterborough Cathedral (1200–22)
 the east end of Worcester Cathedral (1202–18)
 at Hereford Cathedral; the Lady chapel (1217–25) and upper part of the choir (1235–40)
 Salisbury Cathedral (1220–1266; not including Decorated central tower, 1334–80 and Perpendicular crossing arches, 1388–95)
 great transept of York Minster (1226–55)
 east end of Southwell Minster (1234–50)
 east end of Ely Cathedral (1234–54)
 presbytery of St. Albans Cathedral (1235–50)
 the chapter house at Lichfield Cathedral (1239–49)
 Chapel of Nine Altars at Durham Cathedral (1242–80)
 at Chester Cathedral; the chapter house (1249–65) and Lady chapel (1265–90)
 Whitby Abbey 
 Rievaulx Abbey

Decorated Gothic (late 13th–late 14th centuries) 
The second style of English Gothic architecture is generally termed Decorated Gothic, because the amount of ornament and decoration increased dramatically. It corresponded roughly with the Rayonnant period in France, which influenced it. It was a period of growing prosperity in England, and this was expressed in the decoration of Gothic buildings. Almost every feature of the interiors and facades was decorated.

Historians sometimes subdivide this style into two periods, based on the predominant motifs of the designs. The first, the Geometric style, lasted from about 1245 or 50 until 1315 or 1360, where ornament tended to be based on straight lines, cubes and circles, followed by the Curvilinear style (from about 1290 or 1315 until 1350 or 1360) which used gracefully curving lines.

Additions in the Decorated style were often added to earlier cathedrals. One striking example is found at Ely Cathedral; the architect Thomas Witney built the central tower from 1315 to 1322 in Decorated style. Soon afterwards another architect, William Joy, added curving arches to strengthen the structure, and made further extensions to join the Lady Chapel to the Choir. In 1329–45 he created an extraordinary double arch in the decorated style.

Characteristics
Lierne vaulting. Vaulting became much more elaborate in this period. The rib vault of earlier Early Gothic usually had just four compartments, with a minimum number of ribs which were all connected to the columns below, and all played a role in distributing the weight and outwards and downwards. In the Decorated architecture period, additional ribs were added to the vaulted ceilings which were purely decorative. They created very elaborate star patterns and other geometric designs. Gloucester Cathedral and Ely Cathedral have notable lierne vaults from this period.

The buttress became more common in this period, as at Lichfield Cathedral. These were stone columns outside the walls which supports them, allowing thinner and high walls between the buttresses, and larger windows. The buttresses were often topped by ornamental stone pinnacles to give them greater weight.

Fan vaulting. An even more elaborate form, appeared late in the Decorative. Unlike the lierne vault, the fan vault had no functional ribs; the visible "ribs" are mouldings on the masonry imitating ribs. The structure is composed of slabs of stone joined into half-cones, whose vertices are the springers of the vault. The earliest example, from 1373, is found in the cloisters of Gloucester Cathedral. It made a notable backdrop in some of the Harry Potter films.
 Tracery. Decorated architecture is particularly characterised by the elaborate tracery within the stained glass windows. The elaborate windows are subdivided by closely spaced parallel mullions (vertical bars of stone), usually up to the level at which the arched top of the window begins. The mullions then branch out and cross, intersecting to fill the top part of the window with a mesh of elaborate patterns called tracery, typically including trefoils and quatrefoils. The style was geometrical at first and curvilinear, or curving and serpentine, in the later period, This curvilinear element was introduced in the first quarter of the 14th century and lasted about fifty years. A notable example of the curvilinear style is the East window of Carlisle Cathedral, (about 1350). Another notable example of decorated curvilinear is the west window of York Minster (1338–39).
 Sculpture also became more ornate and decorative. The ball flower and a four-leaved flower motif took the place of the earlier dog-tooth. The foliage in the capitals was less conventional than in Early English and more flowing, Another decorative feature of the period was diapering, or creating multi-colour geometric patterns on walls or panels made with different colours of stone or brick.

Examples
 Westminster Abbey (transitional; 1245–72, east end, transept & chapter house; 1376–1400, nave)
 choir of Carlisle Cathedral (transitional; 1245–1398)
 at Hereford Cathedral; north transept (transitional; 1245–68) and central tower (1300–10)
 at Lincoln Cathedral; the Angel Choir and east end (1256–80), cloisters (ca. 1295), central tower (1307–11), and upper part of the south transept, including the Bishop's Eye window (ca. 1320–30)
 at Lichfield Cathedral; the nave and west front (1265–93), central tower (ca. 1300) and Lady Chapel (1320–36)
 Little Wenham Hall, Suffolk (1270–80)
 St Wulfram's Church, Grantham (1280–1350)
 Merton College chapel, Oxford (1289–96; tower and ante-chapel added 1424–50)
 at York Minster; the chapter house (1260–96), nave and west front, including the Heart of Yorkshire window (1291–1375)
 at Wells Cathedral; the chapter house (1275–1310), east end (1310–19, Lady chapel; 1329–45, choir and retro-choir), central tower (1315–22) and strainer arches (1415–23)
 the chapter house at Salisbury Cathedral (1275–85)
 east end of Bristol Cathedral (1298–1340)
 at Southwell Minster; the chapter house (1293–1300), and pulpitum (1320–35)
 the Lady chapel at St. Albans Cathedral (1308–26)
 the chapel of Alnwick Castle (1309–50)
 the nave and west front at Worcester Cathedral (1317–95)
 at Ely Cathedral; the Lady chapel (1321–49; east window, 1371–74) and the octagon, lantern and west bays of nave (1322–62)
 the nave and west front at Exeter Cathedral (1328–42; Image Screen added 1346–75)
 The Lady Chapel at Melrose Abbey Scotland,

Perpendicular Gothic (late 13th to mid-16th century)

The Perpendicular Gothic (or simply Perpendicular) is the third and final style of medieval Gothic architecture in England. It is characterised by an emphasis on vertical lines, and is sometimes called rectilinear.
The Perpendicular style began to emerge in about 1330. The earliest example is the chapter house of Old St Paul's Cathedral, built by the royal architect William de Ramsey in 1332. The early style was also practised by another royal architect, John Sponlee, and fully developed in the works of Henry Yevele and William Wynford.

Walls were built much higher than in earlier periods, and stained glass windows became very large, so that the space around them was reduced to simple piers. Horizontal transoms sometimes had to be introduced to strengthen the vertical mullions.

Many churches were built with magnificent towers including York Minster, Gloucester Cathedral, Worcester Cathedral, and St Botolph's Church, Boston, St Giles' Church, Wrexham, St Mary Magdalene, Taunton. Another outstanding example of Perpendicular is King's College Chapel, Cambridge.

The interiors of Perpendicular churches were filled with lavish ornamental woodwork, including misericords (choir stalls with lifting seats), under which were grotesque carvings; stylized "poppy heads", or carved figures in foliage on the ends of benches; and elaborate multicoloured decoration, usually in floral patterns, on panels or cornices called brattishing. The sinuous lines of the tracery in the Decorated style were replaced by more geometric forms and perpendicular lines.

The style was also affected by the tragic history of the period, particularly the Black Death, which killed an estimated third of England's population in 18 months between June 1348 and December 1349 and returned in 1361–62 to kill another fifth. This had a great effect on the arts and culture, which took a more sober direction.

The perpendicular Gothic was the longest of the English Gothic periods; it continued for a century after the style had nearly disappeared from France and the rest of the European continent, where the Renaissance had already begun. Gradually, near the end of the period, Renaissance forms began to appear in the English Gothic. A rood screen, a Renaissance ornament, was installed in the chapel of King's College Chapel, Cambridge. During the Elizabethan Period (1558–1603), the classical details, including the five orders of classical architecture, were gradually introduced. Carved ornament with Italian Renaissance motifs began to be used in decoration, including on the tomb of Henry VII in Westminster Abbey. The pointed arch gradually gave way to the Roman rounded arch, brick began to replace masonry, the roof construction was concealed, and the Gothic finally gave way to an imitation of Roman and Greek styles.

Characteristics

Towers were an important feature of the perpendicular style, though fewer spires were built than in earlier periods. Important towers were built at Gloucester Cathedral, York Minster, Worcester Cathedral, and on many smaller churches. Decorative Battlements were a popular decoration of towers in smaller churches.
 Windows became very large, sometimes of immense size, with slimmer stone mullions than in earlier periods, allowing greater scope for stained glass craftsmen. The mullions of the windows are carried vertically up into the arch moulding of the windows, and the upper portion is subdivided by additional mullions (supermullions) and transoms, forming rectangular compartments, known as panel tracery. The Tudor Arch window was a particular feature of English Gothic.
 Buttresses and wall surfaces were divided into vertical panels.
 Doorways were frequently enclosed within a square head over the arch mouldings, the spandrels being filled with quatrefoils or tracery. Pointed arches were still used throughout the period, but ogee and four-centred Tudor arches were also introduced.
 Inside the church the triforium disappeared, or its place was filled with panelling, and greater importance was given to the clerestory windows, which often were the finest features in the churches of this period. The mouldings were flatter than those of the earlier periods, and one of the chief characteristics is the introduction of large elliptical hollows.
 Flint architecture. In areas of Southern England using flint architecture, elaborate flushwork decoration in flint and ashlar was used, especially in the wool churches of East Anglia.

Examples
 at Gloucester Cathedral; the choir and transepts (1330–74, remodel of Norman work), cloisters (1370–1412), west front, western nave vaults, and south porch (1421–37), tower (1450–67) and Lady chapel (1457–83)
 at York Minster; the east end (1340–1408), central tower (1420–72), Kings Screen (1420–22) and west towers (1433–72)
 at Winchester Cathedral; the west front (1346–66), and nave (1399–1419, remodel of Norman work)
 at Norwich Cathedral; the clerestory of the presbytery (1362–69; transitional in style), and vaults (1446–72, nave; 1472–99, presbytery; 1501–36, transepts)
 at Worcester Cathedral, the central tower (1374) and cloisters (1375–1438)
 at Canterbury Cathedral; the nave, west front and cloisters  (1379–1414), chapter house (1400–12), transepts (1404–14, south; 1470–82, north), pulpitum (1410–39), southwest tower (1423–34; northwest tower added 1834–41), and central tower (1493–97)
 New College, Oxford (1380–1400; including chapel, hall, Great Quad, cloisters and bell-tower)
 the chapel of Winchester College, Hants. (1387–94)
 Manchester Cathedral (1422)
 Divinity School, Oxford (1427–83)
 Front Quad and chapel of All Souls College, Oxford (1438–42)
 Eton College Chapel, Eton (1441–82)
 King's College Chapel, Cambridge (1446–1515)
 Old Court, hall and chapel of Queens' College, Cambridge (1448–49)
 Magdalen College, Oxford (1474–90, including old library, chapel, cloisters, and founder's tower; Magdalen Tower, Oxford, built 1492–1509)
 Collegiate Church of the Holy Trinity, Tattershall, Lincolnshire)
 choir of Sherborne Abbey (1475 – c. 1580)
 presbytery and lady chapel at Winchester Cathedral (1493–1500)
 at Chester Cathedral; the south transept, western front, central tower and cloisters (1493–1530)
 the retro-choir at Peterborough Cathedral (1496–1508)
 Bath Abbey (1501–39)
 Towers of St Giles' Church, Wrexham, and St Mary Magdalene, Taunton (1503–1508)
 the Henry VII Lady Chapel at Westminster Abbey (1503–09; heavily restored in the 1860s)
 *First Court, Christ's College, Cambridge (1505–11; including chapel and hall)
 First Quad (1511–20, including hall) & Second Quad (1598–1602), St. John's College, Cambridge
 Front Quad, Corpus Christi College, Oxford (1515–et seq.; including hall & chapel)
 Tom Quad, Christ Church, Oxford (1525–29, including great hall)
 Great Court, Trinity College, Cambridge (1599–1608; including hall and chapel)

Roofs

The pitched Gothic timber roof was a distinctive feature of the style, both in religious and domestic architecture. It had to be able to resist rain, snow and high winds of the English climate, and to preserve the integrity of the structure. A pitched roof was a common feature of all the Gothic periods. During the Norman period, the roofs normally were pitched forty-five degrees, with the apex forming a right angle, which harmonised with the rounded arches of the gables. With the arrival of the pointed rib vault, the roofs became steeper, up to sixty degrees. In the late perpendicular period, the angle declined to twenty degrees or even less. The roofs were usually made of boards overlaid with tiles or sheet-lead, which was commonly used on low-pitched roofs.

The simpler Gothic roofs were supported by long rafters of light wood, resting on wooden trusses set into the walls. The rafters were supported by more solid beams, called purlins, which were carried at their ends by the roof trusses. The tie-beam is the chief beam of the truss. Later, the roof was supported by structures called a King-point-truss and Queen-post truss, where the principal rafters are connected with the tie beam by the head of the truss. The King-Point truss has a vertical beam with connects the centre of the rafter to the ridge of the roof, supported by diagonal struts, while a Queen-Post truss has a wooden collar below the pointed arch which united the posts and was supported by struts and cross-braces. A Queen-Post truss could span a width of forty feet. Both of these forms created greater stability, but the full weight of the roof still came down directly onto the walls.

Gothic architects did not like the roof truss systems, because the numerous horizontal beams crossing the nave obstructed the view of the soaring height. They came up with an ingenious solution, the Hammerbeam roof. In this system, the point of the roof is supported by the collar and trusses, but from the collar curved beams reach well downward on the walls, and carry the weight downward and outwards, to the walls and buttresses, without obstructing the view. The oldest existing roof of this kind is found in Winchester Cathedral. The most famous example of the Hammerbeam roof is the roof of Westminster Hall (1395), the largest timber roof of its time, built for royal ceremonies such as the banquets following the coronation of the King. Other notable wooden roofs included those of Christ Church, Oxford, Trinity College, Cambridge, and Crosby Hall. A similar system, with arched trusses, was used in the roof of Wexham Cathedral.

University Gothic

The Gothic style was adopted in the late 13th to 15th centuries in early English university buildings, due in part to the close connection between the universities and the church. The oldest existing example of University Gothic in England is probably the Mob Quad of Merton College, Oxford, constructed between 1288 and 1378. Balliol College, Oxford has examples of Gothic work in the north and west ranges of the front quadrangle, dated to 1431; notably in the medieval hall on the west side, (now the "new library") and the "old library" on the first floor, north side. The architecture at Balliol was often derived from castle architecture, with battlements, rather than from church models. King's College Chapel, Cambridge also used another distinctive Perpendicular Gothic feature, the four-centred arch.

Gothic Revival (19th and 20th centuries) 

The Perpendicular style was less often used in the Gothic Revival than the Decorated style, but major examples include the rebuilt Palace of Westminster (i.e. the Houses of Parliament), Bristol University's Wills Memorial Building (1915–25), and St. Andrew's Cathedral, Sydney.

See also

 Architecture of the medieval cathedrals of England
 Building a Gothic cathedral
 Cathedral architecture of Western Europe
 Collegiate Gothic
 English Gothic stained glass windows
 French Gothic architecture
 Gothic Revival architecture
 Poor Man's Bible

References

Bibliography
 
 Ducher, Robert, Caractéristique des Styles, (1988), Flammarion, Paris (in French);

External links
Britain Express: Decorated Gothic architecture
Britain Express – Architectural Guide
Britain Express – Architectural Guide

 
 
 
12th-century architecture
13th-century architecture
14th-century architecture
15th-century architecture
16th-century architecture
England in the High Middle Ages
Architecture in England
Gothic architecture